The East African montane moorlands is a montane grasslands and shrublands ecoregion which occupies several high mountain peaks in Kenya, South Sudan, Tanzania, and Uganda.

Geography
These include Mount Elgon on the Uganda-Kenya border, The Aberdare Mountains and Mount Kenya in Kenya, and Mount Meru, Mount Kilimanjaro, and Ngorongoro Crater in Tanzania.

The ecoregion occupies areas higher than  elevation. Below the montane moorlands is the East African montane forests ecoregion.

Flora
Plant communities include ericaceous woodland and wooded grassland, Dendrosenecio woodland and wooded grassland, tussock grassland, Helichrysum shrub, and swamps or mires. The flora includes many Afroalpine endemic species which are adapted to the harsh conditions. Adaptations include rosette and tussock forms and silvery leaves. From 3500 to 4500 meters elevation plants can grow up to eight meters high, and include giant species of Dendrosenecio and Lobelia. Tussock grasslands are found in dry and fire-prone areas. Helichrysum scrub is found on dry and rocky slopes. Above 4500 meters elevation vegetation is mostly low cushion plants, including Agrostis sclerophylla and Sagina afroalpina, which extend up to the limit of vegetation at around 5000 meters. The East African moorland flora has much in common with that of the Rwenzori-Virunga montane moorlands.

Fauna
The montane moorlands ecoregion shares several limited-range bird species with the lower-elevation East African montane forests. Hunter's cisticola (Cisticola hunteri) is found on all the mountains in the ecoregion. Jackson's francolin (Pternistis jacksoni) and Sharpe's pipit (Macronyx sharpei) is found on Mount Elgon, the Aberdare Range, and Mount Kenya. The Aberdare cisticola (Cisticola aberdare) is found only in the Aberdare Mountains and the Mau Escarpment.

Protected areas
Protected areas in the ecoregion include Aberdare National Park, Aberdare Forest Reserve, Mount Kenya National Park, Mount Kenya Forest Reserve, Mount Elgon National Park, Kilimanjaro National Park, Arusha National Park, and Kipipiri Forest Reserve.

External links

 
 East African montane moorlands (DOPA)

References

Afromontane ecoregions
Afrotropical ecoregions
Ecoregions of Kenya
Ecoregions of Tanzania
Ecoregions of Uganda
Montane grasslands and shrublands